The citrine white-eye (Zosterops semperi), or Caroline Islands white-eye, is a species of bird in the family Zosteropidae. It is found in Palau and the Federated States of Micronesia.

References

citrine white-eye
Birds of Palau
Birds of the Federated States of Micronesia
citrine white-eye
Taxonomy articles created by Polbot